Phytocoris reuteri is a species of plant bugs belonging to the family Miridae, subfamily Mirinae. It can be found in Austria, Benelux,  Bulgaria, Czech Republic, Estonia, France, Germany, Hungary, Poland, Romania, Slovakia, Switzerland, Scandinavia, and all states of former Yugoslavia (except for Bosnia and Herzegovina and North Macedonia).

References

Insects described in 1876
Hemiptera of Europe
Phytocoris
Taxa named by Edward Saunders (entomologist)